Boristsevo is a rural locality (a village) in Yesiplevskoye Rural Settlement, Kolchuginsky District, Vladimir Oblast, Russia. The population was 15 as of 2010.

Geography 
Boristsevo is located 24 km east of Kolchugino (the district's administrative centre) by road. Dvoryatkino is the nearest rural locality.

References 

Rural localities in Kolchuginsky District